The 1969 Asia Golf Circuit was the eighth season of golf tournaments that comprised the Asia Golf Circuit, formerly known as the Far East Circuit. 

Although Japanese players won five of the seven tournaments, none finished in the top five in the circuit championship as Hsieh Yung-yo of Taiwan won his fourth circuit prize, defending the title he won in 1968.

Schedule
The table below shows the 1969 Asia Golf Circuit schedule. There were no changes from the previous season.

Final standings
The Asia Golf Circuit standings were based on a points system.

References

Asia Golf Circuit
Asia Golf Circuit